Karin Moroder (born 30 November 1974) is an Italian cross-country skier who has competed since 1994. Competing in three Winter Olympics, she won a bronze medal in the 4 × 5 km relay at Nagano in 1998.

Moroder's best finish at the FIS Nordic World Ski Championships was a 24th in the individual sprint at Lahti in 2001.

Her best World Cup finish was third on three occasions, all in team sprint events from 1998 to 2003.

Cross-country skiing results
All results are sourced from the International Ski Federation (FIS).

Olympic Games
 1 medal – (1 bronze)

World Championships

a.  Cancelled due to extremely cold weather.

World Cup

Season standings

Individual podiums
1 podium

Team podiums

 2 podiums – (2 )

References

External links
 
 
 

1974 births
Cross-country skiers at the 1998 Winter Olympics
Cross-country skiers at the 2002 Winter Olympics
Cross-country skiers at the 2010 Winter Olympics
Italian female cross-country skiers
Living people
Olympic cross-country skiers of Italy
Olympic bronze medalists for Italy
Olympic medalists in cross-country skiing
Medalists at the 1998 Winter Olympics
Sportspeople from Bolzano
Moroder family
20th-century Italian women
21st-century Italian women